Aircraft artillery are artillery weapons with a calibre larger than 37 mm mounted on aircraft. First used for ground attack roles during World War I, aircraft artillery has found its use in the present day, most notably on the AC-130.

History

Aircraft artillery was first used for ground attack roles during World War I. A notable user of aircraft artillery was the fighter ace René Fonck.

Notable aircraft using artillery
 Beardmore W.B.V
 Blackburn Perth
 de Havilland Mosquito
 Henschel Hs 129
 Junkers Ju 87
 Junkers Ju 88
 Lockheed AC-130
 Messerschmitt Me 262
 Mitsubishi Ki-67
 North American B-25 Mitchell
 Salmson-Moineau
 SPAD S.XII
 Voisin III, world's first aircraft using artillery.

References

See also
 Gunship
 List of aircraft artillery

 
Artillery by type
Firearms articles needing expert attention